Boris Savostin (16 November 1936 – 5 September 2001) was a Soviet cyclist. He competed in the time trial event at the 1956 Summer Olympics.

References

External links
 

1936 births
2001 deaths
Soviet male cyclists
Olympic cyclists of the Soviet Union
Cyclists at the 1956 Summer Olympics
Place of birth missing